The Komatsu 930E is an off-highway, ultra class, rigid frame, two-axle, diesel/AC electric powertrain haul truck designed and manufactured by Komatsu in Peoria, Illinois, United States. Although the 930E is neither Komatsu's largest nor highest payload capacity haul truck, Komatsu considers the 930E to be the flagship of their haul truck product line.

The 930E is the best selling ultra class haul truck in the world. As of September 2016, Komatsu has sold 1,900 units of 930E.

Public Debut

Innovations
The 930E remained the world's largest, highest payload capacity haul truck until the September, 1998 debut of the  payload capacity Caterpillar 797.

Prior to the introduction of the 930E, diesel/electric haul trucks employed AC from an electric alternator where it was rectified to power the DC traction motors at the rear wheels. The 930E was the first haul truck to employ two AC electric traction motors. The diesel/electric AC powertrain is more efficient, offers better operating characteristics and is more cost effective than a comparable DC powertrain.

Product Improvements
In 1996, the 930E-2 debuted, offering an increased  payload capacity by adding larger Bridgestone 50-80R57 radial tires. In 2000, at MINExpo International, Komatsu debuted the 930E-2SE featuring a  Komatsu SSDA18V170 V-18, twin-turbocharged, diesel engine developed by Industrial Power Alliance, a joint venture between Komatsu and Cummins. This is the same engine that powers the larger  Komatsu 960E-1 and allows the 930E-2SE to operate at elevations up to  without deration. On December 15, 2003 Komatsu introduced the 930E-3, powered by a  Komatsu SSDAl6V160 V-16 engine and a GDY106 traction motor on each side of the rear axle. The current models are the 930E-4 with a  Komatsu SSDAl6V160 V-16 diesel engine and the 930E-4SE with a  Komatsu SSDA18V170 V-18 diesel engine.

Assembly
All Komatsu electric drive haul trucks, including the 930E, are manufactured at Komatsu America Corp's Peoria Manufacturing Operation located at 2300 NE Adams Street in Peoria, Illinois, USA.

Standing in the Komatsu model lineup
The  payload capacity 930-E4 and 930E-4SE are now the second highest payload capacity haul trucks in Komatsu's line up, although the 930E-4SE uses the same  Komatsu SSDA18V170 V-18 engine as the 960E-1.

Specifications

See also
 Haul truck
 Komatsu Limited

References

External links 
Komatsu 930E-4 Product Brochure (PDF)
Komatsu 930E-4 Website - Komatsu America Corp.
Komatsu 930E-4SE Product Brochure (PDF)
Komatsu 930E-4SE Website - Komatsu America Corp.
Komatsu 930E-3 Product Brochure (PDF)
 _930E-2.pdf]_930E-2.pdf Komatsu 930E-2 Product Brochure (PDF)]

Haul trucks
Hybrid trucks
Komatsu vehicles
Vehicles introduced in 1995